The men's combined competition of the 2014 Winter Olympics in Sochi was held on Friday, 14 February, at Rosa Khutor Alpine Resort near Krasnaya Polyana, Russia.

Summary

The downhill was started at 10:00 and the slalom at 15:30. Due to warm temperatures, the downhill was moved up an hour from 11:00, but temperatures were still above freezing in the starting gate.

The gold medalist was Sandro Viletta of Switzerland, who had just one World Cup podium finish, a victory in super-G. Ivica Kostelić of Croatia won the silver medal, already the fourth one in his career (three of them in combined). Christof Innerhofer of Italy, the 2014 downhill silver medalist, won bronze.

Results
The downhill race was started at 11:00 and the slalom race at 15:00.

References

Combined